Hungary competed at the 2014 Summer Youth Olympics, in Nanjing, China from 16 August to 28 August 2014.

Medalists

Athletics

Hungary qualified ten athletes.

Qualification Legend: Q=Final A (medal); qB=Final B (non-medal); qC=Final C (non-medal); qD=Final D (non-medal); qE=Final E (non-medal)

Boys
Field events

Girls
Track & road events

Field events

Basketball

Hungary qualified a boys' and girls' team based on the 1 June 2014 FIBA 3x3 National Federation Rankings.

Skills Competition

Boys' Tournament

Roster
 Kristóf Horváth
 Attila Kis
 Gergely Major
 János Mike

Group stage

Knockout Stage

Girls' Tournament

Roster
 Nina Aho
 Dorottya Nagy
 Cintia Simon
 Tímea Tóth

Group stage

Knockout Stage

Boxing

Hungary qualified three boxers based on its performance at the 2014 AIBA Youth World Championships

Boys

Canoeing

Hungary qualified three boats based on its performance at the 2013 World Junior Canoe Sprint and Slalom Championships.

Boys

Girls

Cycling

Hungary qualified a boys' and girls' team based on its ranking issued by the UCI.

Team

Mixed Relay

Fencing

Hungary qualified four athletes based on its performance at the 2014 FIE Cadet World Championships.

Boys

Girls

Mixed Team

Gymnastics

Artistic Gymnastics

Hungary qualified one athlete based on its performance at the 2014 European MAG Championships and another athlete based on its performance at the 2014 European WAG Championships.

Boys

Girls

Judo

Hungary qualified two athletes based on its performance at the 2013 Cadet World Judo Championships.

Individual

Team

Modern Pentathlon

Hungary qualified one athlete based on its performance at the European YOG Qualifiers and another based on its performance at the 2014 Youth A World Championships.

Sailing

Hungary qualified two boats based on its performance at the 2013 Byte CII World Championships.

Shooting

Hungary qualified one shooter based on its performance at the 2014 European Shooting Championships.

Individual

Team

Swimming

Hungary qualified eight swimmers.

Boys

Girls

Table Tennis

Hungary qualified one athlete based on its performance at the 2014 World Qualification Event and another based on its performance at the European Qualification Tournament.

Singles

Team

Qualification Legend: Q=Main Bracket (medal); qB=Consolation Bracket (non-medal)

Tennis

Hungary qualified three athletes based on the 9 June 2014 ITF World Junior Rankings.

Singles

Doubles

Triathlon

Hungary qualified two athletes based on its performance at the 2014 European Youth Olympic Games Qualifier.

Individual

Relay

Weightlifting

Hungary was given a reallocation spot for being a top ranked nation not yet qualified.

Girls

References

2014 in Hungarian sport
Nations at the 2014 Summer Youth Olympics
Hungary at the Youth Olympics